Robert Edward Hungate (1906-2004) was a pioneering microbial ecologist who developed the first techniques for the culturing of anaerobic microbes in his study of the bovine rumen.

Early life 

Hungate was born on March 2, 1906, in Cheney, Washington, where his father taught biology at the State Normal School at Cheney (now Eastern Washington University) for 46 years. Hungate's father was strongly influenced by his brother-in-law, Charles Piper, and encouraged Hungate's interest in the ecology of Eastern Washington through outings in the local area. Hungate graduated from Cheney Normal in 1924, and served as principal of the Spokane Indian Reservation's elementary school for a year, followed by another two years teaching in Sprague, Washington. He entered Stanford University with the goal of teaching biology at the high school level, but abandoned his plan after his first quarter at Stanford due to his dislike of pedagogy courses and his fellow education students, and instead completed an A.B. in biology magna cum laude in 1929.

Hungate had not yet selected a research topic for his Ph.D. before taking C. B. van Niel's first course at Hopkins Marine Station in 1931. Hungate was the only student, and Van Niel's intimate instruction—Van Niel sat beside him at a table and sketched illustrations on a yellow notepad, which Hungate kept at the end of the lecture—was a turning point in Hungate's scientific career. At Van Niel's suggestion, Hungate selected the symbiotic bacteria of termites as his thesis topic, investigating their role in cellulose digestion. However, he was unsuccessful in his attempts to isolate cellulolytic bacteria from the termite gut because culturing techniques for anaerobic bacteria had not yet been developed, a result that spurred his continued efforts to find methods to do so after he received his Ph.D. in 1935.

Work and discoveries

Termite biology 

Hungate continued his work on the biology of termites after his appointment as lecturer in the Zoology department of the University of Texas, Austin.

Rumen microbiology

The "Hungate" method 

While investigating the role of cellulolytic protozoa  in the rumen of cattle, Hungate isolated a colony of Clostridium cellobioparum, but the difficulty in observing the cellulose clearings they produced in shake tubes spurred him to develop a culturing method using thin agar layers in roll tubes.

Washington State University, Pullman 

At the end of the World War II in 1945, Hungate accepted the offer to join the Bacteriology Department at Washington State College (now Washington State University). Hungate’s laboratory at Washington State University was the first to isolate methanogens using - as an energy source.

University of California, Davis 

Hungate accepted the appointment as Chairman of the Bacteriology Department, University of California, Davis, in 1956. He held his chairmanship until 1962. Here, Hungate mentored many doctoral students, postdoctoral scholars, and visiting scholars.

Selected bibliography

References 

American microbiologists
Stanford University alumni
Scientists from California
1906 births
2004 deaths
People from Cheney, Washington